Meningococcal myelitis is a disorder of the myelin sheath, which is a primary actor in the central nervous system. It has been associated with the meninges.

References

Central nervous system disorders
Myelin disorders